Paul Rousseau may refer to:

 Paul Emile Rousseau (1929–2001), political figure in Saskatchewan, Canada
 Paul Marc Rousseau (born 1989), Canadian musician

See also
Paul Rousso (born 1958), American contemporary artist
Paul Russo (1914–1976), American racecar driver
Paul A. Russo (born 1943), American diplomat
Paul Rusu (born 1984), Romanian rugby union player